The Serbian Armed Forces General Staff is the highest authority within the Serbian Armed Forces and a significant command entity with numerous organizaional units under its direct command.

Missions
General Staff possess operational authority over the armed forces. Its primary roles and responsibilities include: 
developing the command structure
establishing a plan of recruitment and schedule for recruits
regulating training of the armed forces
establishing plans for education and training,
performing other tasks determined by law.

Composition

Members
Members of five most senior ranking officers who make strategic and tactical preparations and procedures for use during peacetime and war.

Associate members

Associate members are heads of specific organizational structures within the General Staff.

Structure

There are various brigades and brigade-size entities directly subordinated to the General Staff, including two brigades of the special forces (thus reducing reaction time when need arise for their operational use).

 63rd Parachute Brigade 
 72nd Brigade for Special Operations  
 Guard
Command Battalion (Belgrade)
Honor Guard Battalion (Belgrade)
25th Military Police Battalion (Belgrade)
Logistics Battalion (Belgrade)
 Signal Brigade
Command Platoon (Belgrade)
1st Signal Battalion (Belgrade)
2nd Signal Battalion (Belgrade)
3rd Signal Battalion (Belgrade)
4th Signal Battalion (Belgrade)
 Central Logistics Base
Command Company (Belgrade)
1st Logistics Center (Belgrade)
1st Depot Battalion (Gornji Milanovac)
2nd Depot Battalion (Kragujevac)
3rd Depot Battalion (Niš)
2nd Retail Center (Niš)
 224th Center for Electronic Action
Command Platoon (Belgrade)
1st Electronic Warfare Battalion (Belgrade)
2nd Electronic Warfare Battalion (Belgrade)
 Technical Testing Center 
 Peacekeeping Operations Center 
 Directorate of Military Police 
  Criminal Investigative Group (Belgrade)
 MP Special Operations Detachment "Cobras" (Belgrade)

See also
 Joint Operations Command
 Intelligence and Reconnaissance Directorate

Notes

References

External links
 General staff of the Serbian Military

 
Military of Serbia
Staff (military)
General Staff